Echo Ranger is a marine autonomous underwater vehicle (AUV) built by Boeing.

Originally built in 2001 to capture high-resolution sonar images of sea beds for oil and natural gas companies, such as the Exxon Mobil Corporation, Echo Ranger underwent testing for possible use by the military. Among its possible military uses are to stalk targets in enemy waters, patrol local harbors to detect national security threats, and scour ocean floors to detect environmental hazards.

See also
Echo Voyager, a successor Boeing AUV

Sources 
Hennigan, W., J., "Boeing tests submarine drone off Santa Catalina Island," Los Angeles Times, August 19, 2001.
auvac.org AUV System Spec Sheet: Echo Ranger platform 
boeing.com Echo Ranger

Robotic submarines
2001 ships